Flexirubin is the main pigment in the bacteria genera Flexibacter, Flavobacterium, Chryseobacterium, and Cytophaga. It was isolated for the first time from Flexibacter elegans. Flexirubin is found in these genera, as well as those that produce carotenoids. The pigment mixture of flexirubin and carotenoids imparts colonies with an intense yellow-orange color. Structurally, this bacteria pigment is based on a polycarboxylic-chromophore that is linked with a phenol by an ester, resulting in an alkyl side-chain. The first total synthesis of flexirubin was reported in 1977.

To test for the presence of flexirubin, a cultural strain with a 20% potassium hydroxide solution is created. A color change from gold to red-brown indicates the presence of flexirubin. Alternatively, the pigment can also be extracted with acetone and chromatographic methods can be used to ascertain its presence.

References 

Phenols
Phenol esters
Alkyl-substituted benzenes
Pigments